The 1926 World Table Tennis Championships – Swaythling Cup (men's team) was the first edition of the men's team championship. 

The cup was named the Swaythling Cup because it was named after the Dowager Lady Swaythling (the mother of Ivor Montagu) who presented the trophy to the English Table Tennis Association in 1926.

Hungary defeated Austria 5-4 in a play off for the gold medal following the fact that they tied with five wins each in the main competition. The winning team consisted of Roland Jacobi, Zoltán Mechlovits, Béla von Kehrling and Daniel Pecsi.

Swaythling Cup results

Final Table

Final Play Off

See also
List of World Table Tennis Championships medalists

References

-